Marshall Limon (27 August 1915 – 19 March 1965) was a Canadian sprinter. He competed in the men's 400 metres at the 1936 Summer Olympics.

See also

Archives 
There is a Marshall N. Limon fonds at Library and Archives Canada. The archival reference number is R16638.

References

External links
 

1915 births
1965 deaths
Athletes (track and field) at the 1936 Summer Olympics
Canadian male sprinters
Olympic track and field athletes of Canada
Athletes from Vancouver